In Greek mythology, Tyndareus (Ancient Greek: Τυνδάρεος, Tundáreos; Attic: Τυνδάρεως, Tundáreōs) was a Spartan king.

Family 
Tyndareus was the son of Oebalus (or Perieres) and Gorgophone (or Bateia). He married the Aetolian princess, Leda, by whom he became the father of Castor, Clytemnestra, Timandra, Phoebe and Philonoe, and the stepfather of Helen of Troy and Pollux.

Mythology

Early years 
Tyndareus had a brother named Hippocoon, who seized power and exiled Tyndareus. He was reinstated by Heracles, who killed Hippocoon and his sons. Tyndareus’ other brother was Icarius, the father of Penelope.

Tyndareus’ wife Leda was seduced by Zeus, who disguised himself as a swan. She laid two eggs, each producing two children.

When Thyestes seized control in Mycenae, two exiled princes, Agamemnon and Menelaus came to Sparta, where they were received as guests and lived for a number of years.  The princes eventually married Tyndareus' daughters, Clytemnestra and Helen respectively.

Curse of the goddess 
According to Stesichorus, while sacrificing to the gods Tyndareus forgot to honor Aphrodite and thus the goddess was angered and made his daughters twice and thrice wed and deserters of their husbands. As what Hesiod also says:

Helen and the Trojan War

Helen was the most beautiful woman in the world, and when it was time for her to marry, many Greek kings and princes came to seek her hand or sent emissaries to do so on their behalf. Among the contenders were Odysseus, Ajax the Great, Diomedes, Idomeneus, and both Menelaus and Agamemnon. All but Odysseus brought many and rich gifts with them. Helen's favourite was Menelaus who, according to some sources, did not come in person but was represented by his brother Agamemnon, who chose to support his brother's case, and himself married Helen's half-sister Clytemnestra instead.

Tyndareus would accept none of the gifts, nor would he send any of the suitors away for fear of offending them and giving grounds for a quarrel. Odysseus promised to solve the problem in a satisfactory manner if Tyndareus would support him in his courting of Penelope, the daughter of Icarius. Tyndareus readily agreed and Odysseus proposed that, before the decision was made, all the suitors should swear a most solemn oath to defend the chosen husband against whoever should quarrel with the chosen one. This stratagem succeeded and Helen and Menelaus were married. Eventually, Tyndareus resigned in favour of his son-in-law and Menelaus became king.

Some years later, Paris, a Trojan prince came to Sparta to marry Helen, whom he had been promised by Aphrodite. Helen left with him – either willingly because she had fallen in love with him, or because he kidnapped her, depending on the source – leaving behind Menelaus and Hermione, their nine-year-old daughter. Menelaus attempted to retrieve Helen by calling on all her former suitors to fulfil their oaths, leading to the Trojan War.

Afterwards
According to Euripides's Orestes, Tyndareus was still alive at the time of Menelaus’ return, and was trying to secure the death penalty for his grandson Orestes due to the latter's murder of his own mother who was also Tyndareus’ daughter, Clytemnestra, but according to other accounts he had died prior to the Trojan War. In some versions of the myth, Tyndareus was one of the dead men resurrected by Asclepius to live again.

Notes

References 

 Apollodorus, The Library with an English Translation by Sir James George Frazer, F.B.A., F.R.S. in 2 Volumes, Cambridge, MA, Harvard University Press; London, William Heinemann Ltd. 1921. ISBN 0-674-99135-4. Online version at the Perseus Digital Library. Greek text available from the same website.
 Euripides, The Complete Greek Drama, edited by Whitney J. Oates and Eugene O'Neill, Jr. in two volumes. 2. Helen, translated by Robert Potter. New York. Random House. 1938. Online version at the Perseus Digital Library.
 Euripides, Euripidis Fabulae. vol. 3. Gilbert Murray. Oxford. Clarendon Press, Oxford. 1913. Greek text available at the Perseus Digital Library.
 Herodotus, The Histories with an English translation by A. D. Godley. Cambridge. Harvard University Press. 1920. . Online version at the Topos Text Project. Greek text available at Perseus Digital Library.
 Hesiod, Catalogue of Women from Homeric Hymns, Epic Cycle, Homerica translated by Evelyn-White, H G. Loeb Classical Library Volume 57. London: William Heinemann, 1914. Online version at theio.com
 Pausanias, Description of Greece with an English Translation by W.H.S. Jones, Litt.D., and H.A. Ormerod, M.A., in 4 Volumes. Cambridge, MA, Harvard University Press; London, William Heinemann Ltd. 1918. . Online version at the Perseus Digital Library
 Pausanias, Graeciae Descriptio. 3 vols. Leipzig, Teubner. 1903.  Greek text available at the Perseus Digital Library.
 Publius Vergilius Maro, Aeneid. Theodore C. Williams. trans. Boston. Houghton Mifflin Co. 1910. Online version at the Perseus Digital Library.
 Publius Vergilius Maro, Bucolics, Aeneid, and Georgics. J. B. Greenough. Boston. Ginn & Co. 1900. Latin text available at the Perseus Digital Library.
 Tzetzes, John, Book of Histories, Book IX-X translated by Jonathan Alexander from the original Greek of T. Kiessling's edition of 1826. Online version at theio.com

Mythological kings of Sparta
Kings in Greek mythology
Laconian characters in Greek mythology
Mythology of Heracles